Saint Godelieve (also known as Godeleva, Godeliève, and Godelina) ( 10526 July 1070) is a Flemish saint. She behaved with charity & gentleness to all, accepting an arranged marriage as was the custom, but her husband and family turned out to be abusive. Eventually he had her strangled by his servants. 

Every year, on the Sunday following 5 July, a procession celebrating Saint Godelieve takes place in Gistel.

Hagiography
Tradition, as recorded in her Vita, states that she was pious as a young girl, and became much sought after by suitors as a beautiful young woman. Godelieve, however, wanted to become a nun. A nobleman named Bertolf (Berthold) of Gistel, however, determined to marry her, successfully invoked the help of her father's overlord, Eustace II, Count of Boulogne, along with her parents. She accepted the betrothal obediently & went to Bertolf's family home. There she was badly treated by him & his mother, while she continued to live an obedient daughter-in-law & managed the household well & with Christian charity.  Bertold became more dis-satisfied with her & he ordered his servants to provide only bread and water to the young bride.  Godelieve shared this food with the poor.

Godelieve managed to escape to the home of her father, Hemfrid, seigneur of Wierre-Effroy.  Hemfrid, appealing to the Bishops of Tournai and Soissons and the Count of Flanders, they concluded the marriage to be indissoluble and managed to have Bertolf restore Godelieve to her rightful position as his wife, which signaled a renewal of persecution.

In July 1070, Godelieve returned to Gistel and soon after, at the order of Bertolf, was strangled by two servants and thrown into a pool, causing it to appear she died a natural death.

Legend
According to legend, Bertolf married again, and had a daughter Edith, who was born blind: the legend  states that Edith was cured through the intercession of Saint Godelieve. Bertolf, now repentant of his crimes, went to Rome to obtain absolution. He went on a pilgrimage to the Holy Land, and became a monk at St. Winnoc's Abbey at Bergues. Edith founded a Benedictine monastery at Gistel, which was dedicated to Saint Godelieve, which she joined herself as a nun.

Veneration
Godelieve's body was exhumed in 1084 by the Bishops of Tournai and Noyon, in the presence of Gertrude of Saxony, the wife of Robert I, Count of Flanders, the Abbot of St. Winnoc's and a number of clergymen. It was Radbod II, bishop of Noyon-Tournai, that consecrated Godelieve's relics in 1084, and Godelieve's popular cult developed thereafter.

Drogo, a monk of St. Winnoc's Abbey, wrote Godelieve's biography, the Vita Godeliph, about ten years after her death. The abbey of Ten Putte Abbey in Bruges was dedicated to her.

Every year, on the Sunday following 5 July, a procession celebrating Saint Godelieve takes place in Gistel. In 2017, the Godelieve procession was recognized as an Intangible Cultural Heritage.

Godelieve's feast day, 6 July, was, like that of Saint Swithun in England and Saint Medard in France, connected with the weather. She is thus considered one of the "weather saints". 
A monastery of Benedictine nuns was established on the site of her home, belonging to the Subiaco Congregation. It was closed due to falling numbers about 2020; the building is currently under review by the city/church authorities.

The Godelieve Polyptych
Godelieve's life is represented in the Godelieve Polyptych, now in the Metropolitan Museum of Art in New York City.

Notes

References

Sources

External links

 Godeleva (Godelina) von Gistel 
 Santa Godeleva 
 Saint Godelieve, Martyr at the Christian Iconography web site

1050s births
1070 deaths
Weather lore
Domestic violence
Christian female saints of the Middle Ages
11th-century Christian saints
11th-century women of the Holy Roman Empire